Zhang Hui or Hui Zhang is the name of:

Zhang Hui (basketball) (born 1959), Chinese female basketball player
Zhang Hui (speed skater) (born 1988), Chinese female short track speed skater
Zhang Hui (footballer, born 1997), Chinese male association footballer
Zhang Hui (footballer, born 2000), Chinese male association footballer
Hui Zhang (computer scientist), Chinese-American computer scientist
Hui Zhang (pathologist), Chinese-American pathologist